Ardbeg may refer to:

Ardbeg, Bute, a settlement on the island of Bute in Scotland
Ardbeg, Islay, a small settlement on the island of Islay off the west coast of Scotland
Ardbeg distillery, or its product, a Scotch whisky distillery in Ardbeg
Ardbeg, Ontario, a community in Whitestone, Ontario, Canada

See also
 Arbegas